Jason Chee may refer to:

Chee Weng Fai Jason (born 1983) from Singapore